Eggenfelden (Central Bavarian: Eggenfejdn) is a municipality in the district of Rottal-Inn in Bavaria, Germany.

Geography

Geographical location
Eggenfelden is located in the valley of the Rott at the intersection of B 20 with the B 388 and the beginning of the B 588. The city has two railway stations on the railway Passau - Neumarkt - Sankt Veit as well as an airfield (airfield Eggenfelden). Eggenfelden is located about 56 km southeast of Landshut, 60 km south of Straubing, 70 km south-west of Passau, 84 kilometers north of Salzburg and 110 kilometers east of Munich.

Communal
The municipality Eggenfelden has 119 officially named Stadtteile:

 Afuswimm
 Aichner
 Aign
 Altenburg
 Anzengrub
 Asbach
 Au
 Axöd
 Axöd-Siedlung
 Bachkampel
 Berg
 Bruck
 Bruckhäuser
 Buchner
 Dietraching
 Drittenbrei
 Dürrwimm
 Eder vorm Wald
 Edmertsee
 Eggenfelden
 Falterer
 Fäustlinger
 Fraunhofen
 Freiung
 Fuchsberg
 Fuchsmühle
 Fußöd
 Gaisberg
 Gall
 Gern
 Gfürt
 Giglberg
 Gras
 Gschwend
 Hänghub
 Hartlwimm
 Haus
 Heckengrub
 Hetzenberg
 Hinterhöll
 Hochwimm
 Höll
 Holzbruck
 Holzhäuseln
 Holzkeller
 Holzner
 Holzschachten
 Hub
 Kagern
 Kampelsberg
 Kaspersbach
 Kastenberg
 Käufl
 Kirchberg
 Kleeham
 Kleingmain
 Klohub
 Kollersberg
 Königsöd
 Kreuzöd
 Kronwitt
 Lauterbach
 Lichtenberg
 Lichtlberg
 Lindhof
 Loh
 Luderfing
 Lug
 Maißling
 Mitterhof
 Mitterpirsting
 Moosham
 Neustatt
 Niederndorf
 Oberkampel
 Oberkirchberg
 Oberpirsting
 Oberthal
 Oberzeiling
 Peterskirchen
 Pirsting
 Pischelsberg
 Pollersbach
 Prühmühle
 Reiter
 Reiter am Wald
 Rinn
 Rott
 Rott am Wald
 Rottmühle
 Rushäusl
 Sandtner
 Sankt Sebastian
 Simonsöd
 Spanberg
 Sperwies
 Stock
 Straß I
 Straß II
 Straßhäuseln
 Stumsöd
 Taschnerhof
 Thal
 Tiefstadt
 Untereschlbach
 Unterkampel
 Untermaisbach
 Unterpirsting
 Unterthal
 Unterzeiling
 Vorderhöll
 Weg
 Weilberg
 Weilberg-Siedlung
 Weinberg
 Wimm
 Wolfsberg
 Zainach
 Zellhub

Mayors
 1946–1948: Lorenz Fichtner, SPD
 1948–1960: Lorenz Bachmeier, CSU
 1960–1990: Hans Kreck, SPD
 1990–2002: Karl Riedler, SPD
 2002–2014: Werner Schießl, FWG
 2014–2020: Wolfgang Grubwinkler, UWG
 since 2020: Martin Biber, CSU

Notable people
The ski mountaineer Konrad Lex was born in Eggenfelden.
The German pop-singer and actor Daniel Küblböck who achieved short-lived celebrity in 2003, in the first season of Deutschland sucht den Superstar  (DSDS), the German version of Pop Idol, in which he came third, was born outside of Eggenfelden and lived here until his breakthrough.

Personalities

Sons and daughters of the city 

 Albert Hahl (1868-1945), German colonial officer and governor of German-New Guinea
 Richard Schimpf (1897-1972), officer of the German Army, the Reichswehr, the Wehrmacht and the Bundeswehr (last rank major general)
 Friedrich Müller (born 1938), legal scientist and author
 Joseph Vogl (born 1957), literary and media scientist
 Katrin Garfoot (born 1981), Australian cyclist
  Barbara Lechner (born 1982), shooting sports woman

Other people related to Eggenfelden 

 Fritz Wiedemann (1891-1970), German officer, adjutant of Adolf Hitler and diplomat
 Daniel Küblböck (born 1985), DSDS participant and singer

References

External links
Official Site

Rottal-Inn